James Francis Oswald (1838–1908) was a British politician. He was elected as a Conservative Member of Parliament for Oldham in 1895, resigning in 1899 by becoming Steward of the Manor of Northstead.

External links 
 

1838 births
1908 deaths
Conservative Party (UK) MPs for English constituencies
UK MPs 1895–1900
Politics of the Metropolitan Borough of Oldham
Members of the Parliament of the United Kingdom for constituencies in Lancashire